Leleti Khumalo  (born 30 March 1970) is a South African actress known for her leading role in the movie and stage play Sarafina! and for her roles in other films such as Hotel Rwanda, Yesterday and Invictus, as well as the soap opera Imbewu: The Seed where she plays Nokubonga "MaZulu" Bhengu. And the Uzalo as MaNzuza  
In Sarafina!, She struggled for freedom for black people during Apartheid. We know her as a song called ' Freedom is coming Tomorrow ' which is sang by Khanyo Maphumulo

Early life and Sarafina!
Khumalo was born in KwaMashu township, north of Durban, South Africa. Showing an interest in performing from an early age, she joined a youth backyard dance group called Amajika, mentored by Tu Nokwe.

In 1985 she auditioned for the Mbongeni Ngema musical which was to become the international blockbuster Sarafina!; Ngema wrote the lead character of Sarafina for Khumalo. She  later married him, but they divorced. She is currently married to businessman Skhutazo Winston Khanyile and she gave birth to their twins Ulwenzile and Yamukelani Khanyile.

Khumalo performed the role of Sarafina on stages in South Africa and on Broadway, where she received a 1988 Tony Award nomination for Best Actress in a Musical. Sarafina! had a Broadway run lasting two years, after which the production embarked on a worldwide tour. In 1987 Khumalo received a NAACP Image Award for Best Stage Actress. In 1992, she starred alongside Whoopi Goldberg, Miriam Makeba and John Kani in Darrell James Roodt's film version of Sarafina!, which had a worldwide distribution, and became the biggest film production to be released on the African continent. Khumalo was nominated for an Image Award, together with Angela Bassett, Whoopi Goldberg and Janet Jackson. Based on the 1976 Soweto youth uprisings, Sarafina! tells the story of a young school girl who is not afraid to fight for her rights and inspires her peers to rise up in protest, especially after her inspirational teacher, Mary Masombuka (Goldberg) is imprisoned and murdered.

In 1993, Khumalo released her first album, Leleti and Sarafina.

Sarafina! was re-released in South Africa on 16 June 2006 to commemorate the 30th anniversary of the youth uprisings in Soweto.

Subsequent roles 
Khumalo co-starred in Mbongeni Ngema's international musical Magic at 4 AM which was dedicated to Muhammad Ali. She subsequently starred in another Ngema musical, Mama (1996), which toured Europe and Australia. In 1997, she starred in Sarafina 2.

Khumalo starred in the 2004 movies Hotel Rwanda and Yesterday; the latter was nominated for a 2005 Academy Award in the category "Best Foreign Language Film". Yesterday also scooped the Best Film award at India's Pune International Film Festival and had positive reactions at the Venice and Toronto International Film Festivals.

Khumalo joined the cast of one of South Africa's longest running soap operas, Generations in 2005 as Busiswe (Busi) Dlomo, a refined and altruistic no-nonsense woman who heads up her own publishing empire, based in Cape Town. Her character is the younger sister to Sibusiso Dlomo and has none of the power-hungry, egotistical and callous characteristics he (Sibusiso) has. She has used her intellect and savvy to get where she is today, at the helm of South Africa's fictional top communications company, Ezweni, which she runs with her brother and founder Karabo Moroka.

In 2015 Khumalo joined the cast of Uzalo and played as Zandile "MaNzuza" Mdletshe. The role marked her first on-screen appearance after a two-year hiatus from acting to raise her children.

In 2015 Leleti was invited to Zanzibar Island, Tanzania, as a chief guest of the famous African film festivals known as the Zanzibar film Festivals, for its 18th anniversary celebrations.

She currently plays Mazulu on e.tv's Imbewu.

Filmography

References

External links 

Images of Khumalo in the movie Yesterday
Generations Cast Bio for Khumalo
 Leleti Khumalo at Who's Who Southern Africa

1970 births
Living people
Actors from Durban
South African film actresses
South African musical theatre actresses